In Greek mythology, Celaeno (Kelaino, lit. 'the dark one', also Celeno or Kelaino, sometimes [misspelled] Calaeno) referred to several different figures.

Celaeno, one of the Pleiades. She was said to be mother of Lycus and Nycteus, of King Eurypylus (or Eurytus) of Cyrene, and of Lycaon, also by Poseidon 
Celaeno, one of the Harpies, whom Aeneas encountered at Strophades. She gave him prophecies of his coming journeys.
Celaeno, one of the Danaïdes, the daughters of Danaus. Her mother was Crino. She married and killed Hyperbius, son of Aegyptus and Hephaestine. She was also believed to have had a son Celaenus by Poseidon.
Celaeno, a Phocian princess as the daughter of King Hyamus of Hyampolis, son of Lycorus. Her mother was Melantheia (Melantho), daughter of Deucalion. Celaeno or her sister Melanis became the mother of Delphus by Apollo. 
Celaeno, daughter of Ergea by Poseidon. She was the mother of Lycus and Chimaereus by Prometheus.
Celaeno, an Amazon. She was killed by Heracles whilst he was undertaking the ninth labour.

Astronomical objects 
 Celaeno, a star in the constellation of Taurus.

In popular culture 

 The harpy Celaeno appears as a captive of a traveling witch's Midnight Carnival, in the Peter S. Beagle classic fantasy novel The Last Unicorn and the 1982 film based on the book.
 Captain Celaeno is the name of the leader of a pirate crew of parrot-like creatures who help the ponies in My Little Pony: The Movie.
 Celaena Sardothien, the main character of the Throne of Glass series. Sarah J. Maas, the author has cited Celaeno as her inspiration for the name.
 The Celaeno Fragments are a series of occult writings (created by H. P. Lovecraft’s friend and contemporary August Derleth for his series The Trail of Cthulhu) ascribed to Dr Laban Shrewsbury, and written from memory after a series of visits to the Great Library of Celaeno, located in a star system in the Pleiades.

Notes

References 

 Diodorus Siculus, The Library of History translated by Charles Henry Oldfather. Twelve volumes. Loeb Classical Library. Cambridge, Massachusetts: Harvard University Press; London: William Heinemann, Ltd. 1989. Vol. 3. Books 4.59–8. Online version at Bill Thayer's Web Site
 Diodorus Siculus, Bibliotheca Historica. Vol 1-2. Immanel Bekker. Ludwig Dindorf. Friedrich Vogel. in aedibus B. G. Teubneri. Leipzig. 1888–1890. Greek text available at the Perseus Digital Library.
 Gaius Julius Hyginus, Fabulae from The Myths of Hyginus translated and edited by Mary Grant. University of Kansas Publications in Humanistic Studies. Online version at the Topos Text Project.
 Maurus Servius Honoratus, In Vergilii carmina comentarii. Servii Grammatici qui feruntur in Vergilii carmina commentarii; recensuerunt Georgius Thilo et Hermannus Hagen. Georgius Thilo. Leipzig. B. G. Teubner. 1881. Online version at the Perseus Digital Library.
 Pausanias, Description of Greece with an English Translation by W.H.S. Jones, Litt.D., and H.A. Ormerod, M.A., in 4 Volumes. Cambridge, MA, Harvard University Press; London, William Heinemann Ltd. 1918. Online version at the Perseus Digital Library
 Pausanias, Graeciae Descriptio. 3 vols. Leipzig, Teubner. 1903.  Greek text available at the Perseus Digital Library.
 Apollodorus, The Library with an English Translation by Sir James George Frazer, F.B.A., F.R.S. in 2 Volumes, Cambridge, MA, Harvard University Press; London, William Heinemann Ltd. 1921. Online version at the Perseus Digital Library. Greek text available from the same website.
 Strabo, The Geography of Strabo. Edition by H.L. Jones. Cambridge, Mass.: Harvard University Press; London: William Heinemann, Ltd. 1924. Online version at the Perseus Digital Library.
 Strabo, Geographica edited by A. Meineke. Leipzig: Teubner. 1877. Greek text available at the Perseus Digital Library.

Pleiades (Greek mythology)
Women of Poseidon
Harpies
Characters in the Aeneid
Characters in the Argonautica
Danaids
Princesses in Greek mythology
Libyan characters in Greek mythology
Women of Apollo
Children of Poseidon
Amazons (Greek mythology)
Characters in Roman mythology